= Tay Cheng Khoon =

Singaporean journalist (1948–2007)

Tay Cheng Khoon (1948–2007) was the sports editor of The Straits Times in Singapore where he had a weekly Sunday column.

He was the premier Squash reporter during the 1980s when Singapore had one of the top teams in the world. He covered many sports ranging from the 2004 Athens Olympics to golf at the British Open and The Masters. He died at the age of 58 from cancer.
